Earldom of Ormond may refer to:

Earl of Ormond (Scotland), created twice in the Peerage of Scotland for the House of Douglas
Earl of Ormond (Ireland), created twice in the Peerage of Ireland for the Butler Family

fr:Comte d'Ormonde